Mitsuhiko (written: 光彦 or 三彦) is a masculine Japanese given name. Notable people with the name include:

, Japanese photographer
, Japanese basketball coach
, Japanese golfer
, Japanese sumo wrestler

Japanese masculine given names